Trombidium neumeyeri is a species of mite in the genus Trombidium in the family Trombidiidae. It is found in Japan.

References
 Synopsis of the described Arachnida of the World: Trombidiidae

Trombidiidae
Arthropods of Japan
Animals described in 1916